The Zona da Mata ("Forest Belt") is the narrow coastal plain between the Atlantic Ocean and the dry agreste and sertão regions in the northeastern Brazilian states of Maranhão, Piauí, Rio Grande do Norte, Paraíba, Pernambuco, Alagoas, Sergipe and Bahia.

The climate is tropical hot and wet (humid), with most rain coming from the southeasterly winds between April and July.

Because the climate and soil of the zona da mata are excellent for the production of sugar cane, very little of the original Atlantic Rainforest vegetation remains. Most of the major cities of northeastern Brazil, including Recife, Salvador, Maceió, Aracaju and João Pessoa, are located in the zona da mata.

References

Northeast Region, Brazil
Climate of Brazil